Technomyrmex elatior is a species of dolichoderine ant which is a widespread species that can be found in many Indo-Australian, Oriental, and Palaearctic regions.

Distribution
This widespread Asian ant can be found in Borneo, Brunei, Indonesia, Malaysia, Philippines, Singapore, Cambodia, India, Nepal, Sri Lanka, Vietnam, China, and Italy.

References

 https://www.itis.gov/servlet/SingleRpt/SingleRpt?search_topic=TSN&search_value=575167
 http://animaldiversity.org/accounts/Technomyrmex_elatior/classification/#Technomyrmex_elatior

External links

 at antwiki.org

Dolichoderinae
Hymenoptera of Asia
Insects described in 1902